Iapir is a genus of beetles in the family Torridincolidae, containing these species:

 Iapir borgmeieri (Reichardt & Costa, 1961)
 Iapir britskii (Reichardt & Costa, 1967)
 Iapir castalia Reichardt, 1973
 Iapir trombetensis (Fonseca, Py-Daniel & Barbosa, 1991)

References

Myxophaga genera